KIS Guangjae (광제호,廣濟號) is the second naval ship of the Korean Imperial Navy. It was operated by the Korean Empire. The Guangjae's captain was Sin Sun-seong, who studied naval science in Tokyo, Japan. The ship was forced to decommission by the Japan-Korea Treaty of 1905. It was finally used for transportation of coals from 1941 until Korea was freed from Japan.

References

Jung, Yong-soo. "[News Clip] Special Knowledge: How to Christen Navy Battleships." The Joongang Ilbo [Seoul] 31 May 2012: Web.

1904 ships
Korean Empire
Naval ships of Korea
Ships built by Kawasaki Heavy Industries